Mutia, officially the Municipality of Mutia (Subanen: Benwa Mutia; Chavacano: Municipalidad de Mutia), is a 5th class municipality in the province of Zamboanga del Norte, Philippines. According to the 2020 census, it has a population of 11,726 people.

Geography

Barangays
Mutia is politically subdivided into 16 barangays.

Climate

Demographics

Economy

References

External links
 Mutia Profile at PhilAtlas.com
 [ Philippine Standard Geographic Code]
Philippine Census Information

Municipalities of Zamboanga del Norte